James Locke may refer to:
 James William Locke, American judge and politician in Florida
 James Locke (draper), London draper

See also
 James Lock (disambiguation)